Addington is a town in Jefferson County, Oklahoma, United States. The population was 114 at the 2010 census, a decrease of 2.6 percent from the figure of 117 in 2000. The town was founded in 1890.

History
The post office was established on January 8, 1896.  The name of the town comes from the name of its first postmaster, James P. Addington.

Located on the Chicago, Rock Island and Pacific Railroad.
Daniel Leal was the first mayor, appointed by the governor.

Former newspapers were the Addington Free Lance, the Addington Advertiser, the Addington Journal, and the Addington Herald.

The town was incorporated in 1901. The peak population was circa 1915, with 1,000 citizens. The town's growth stopped about the time World War I began, and has continued to decline ever since.

The post office in Addington is slated for possible closure by the US Postal service.

Geography
Addington is located at  (34.243206, -97.966591).

Demographics

At the 2010 census, there were 114 people living in the town.  The population density was 570 per square mile (190/km).  There were 59 housing units at an average density of 235 per square mile (89/km).  The racial makeup of the town was 92.31% White, 2.56% Native American, 3.42% from other races, and 1.71% from two or more races. Hispanic or Latino of any race were 5.98% of the population.

There were 44 households, of which 31.8% had children under the age of 18 living with them, 56.8% were married couples living together, 11.4% had a female householder with no husband present, and 29.5% were non-families. 27.3% of all households were made up of individuals, and 13.6% had someone living alone who was 65 years of age or older. The average household size was 2.66 and the average family size was 3.23.

Age distribution was 26.5% under the age of 18, 12.8% from 18 to 24, 23.9% from 25 to 44, 19.7% from 45 to 64, and 17.1% who were 65 years of age or older. The median age was 38 years. For every 100 females, there were 98.3 males. For every 100 females age 18 and over, there were 91.1 males.

The median household income was $40,417, and the median family income was $48,750. Males had a median income of $36,250 versus $22,250 for females. The per capita income for the town was $15,170. There were 16.7% of families and 9.6% of the population living below the poverty line, including no under eighteens and 21.4% of those over 64.

References

External links
Encyclopedia of Oklahoma - Addington

Towns in Jefferson County, Oklahoma
Towns in Oklahoma